Craig Stanley (born 3 March 1983) is an English footballer who plays as midfielder for Hythe & Dibden.

Career
Stanley began his career with Walsall. He was a key member of the Hereford side that clinched promotion to the Football League after play-off victories over the Shrimps and Halifax Town in the 2005–06 season.

Stanley signed for Morecambe in 2006 and won another consecutive promotion to the Football league. He left Morecambe in 2011 after several successful seasons, as he fell out with manager Sammy McIlroy.

Stanley captained the England National XI to a 4–1 victory over the Netherlands on 29 November 2006, winning the European Challenge Trophy.

On 31 January 2011, Stanley signed for Torquay United in a one-month loan deal. After an impressive stint with Torquay, the loan was extended until the end of the season.

He became Bristol Rovers' third signing of their recent push for promotion back into League One, Stanley signed on 7 June 2011.

He has been announced as the captain of Aldershot Town for the 2013–2014 season. He left the club at the end of the season after failing to agree a new contract.
On 15 June 2018 Stanley signed for Lancaster City. Following the resignation of Lancaster manager Phil Brown on 10 September 2018, the club appointed Craig Stanley as caretaker manager together with Matthew Blinkhorn. After a six-game spell in charge Stanley lost out on the job on a permanent basis and on 8 January 2019, Stanley joined Kettering Town. Six months later, he joined Clitheroe.

In September 2019, Stanley joined Nuneaton Borough. On 3 November 2019 the club confirmed, that Stanley had left the club again because the traveling time from his home to the club, was too long.

In November 2021, Stanley joined Wessex League Premier Division club Hythe & Dibden, helping to captain the side to survival with a 3–0 victory over Cowes Sports which saw the side reprieved from relegation. 

In March 2023, after quitting managerial duties at Blackfield & Langley, he returned to former club Hythe & Dibden as a player.

Coaching Career
In June 2022, Stanley was appointed manager of Wessex League Division One club Totton & Eling. Stanley resigned from his role on 3 August without having managed a competitive fixture. In November 2022, he took over as manager of Blackfield & Langley and was also registered as a player. On 1 March 2023, he resigned from his role as manager.

Personal Life
Stanley has type 1 diabetes.

Honours
Football Conference Play-Off Winner 2006, 2007

References

External links

Craig Stanley at Aylesbury United
Profile at Wessex Football League

1983 births
Living people
Association football midfielders
People from Bedworth
English footballers
England semi-pro international footballers
Bristol Rovers F.C. players
Hereford United F.C. players
Morecambe F.C. players
Walsall F.C. players
AFC Telford United players
Raith Rovers F.C. players
Aldershot Town F.C. players
Eastleigh F.C. players
Lincoln City F.C. players
Barwell F.C. players
Kettering Town F.C. players
Clitheroe F.C. players
Nuneaton Borough F.C. players
Lymington Town F.C. players
Hythe & Dibden F.C. players
English Football League players
Scottish Professional Football League players
National League (English football) players
Northern Premier League players
Southern Football League players
English football managers
Lancaster City F.C. managers
Northern Premier League managers
Wessex Football League players
People with type 1 diabetes